The Wee-Beasties are a nine-piece punk rock band formed in 2000 by Richard Haskins. The band has had a longstanding cult following in the Denton area, playing upwards of fifty performances which they have claimed to be their "last show ever". Notably, they have performed at the 35 Conferette in 2011 and on the Warped Tour 2011. The Wee-Beasties began achieving more widespread notoriety in 2021, when their return to regularly scheduled shows garnered the attention of local publications Central Track and the Dallas Observer, which recognized the band as one of North Texas’ 10 Best Live Acts. During its spring ’22 tour, the LA Weekly called this Denton, TX, symphonic brass punk collective “the sort of band you might want to check out twice." 

The Wee-Beasties' live performances are a spectacle known for onstage antics, and past shows have included BDSM demonstrations, Chippendales costumes, the punk rock burlesque, and heroic consumption of countless cans of Lone Star beer (or whatever is cheapest). 

Fronted by the larger-than-life, beer-guzzling, mostly-naked Richard Haskins, the band consists of drums, two guitars, a bass and a colorful cast of horn players, including Richard Haskins, vocals; Stephanie Holloway, vocals; Paul Burke, bass; Kyle Harper, guitar; Stephenie Blaise, guitar; Trent Jones, drums; Tomo, trumpet; John Wier, trumpet; Niin, trumpet/keys; and Andres Noriega, trumpet. Over twenty years, the band's lineup has included dozens of musicians; the original members included bassist David Dutton and drummer Brian Hutmacher.

Discography

Studio albums
 Party With Us! (2022)
 Kill Them! (2011)
 Early/Unreleased (2005)
 Listen Up, Motherfuckers! (2003)

7"
 Don't Shred On Me: Volume 1 [split w/ Brave Combo] (2011)

E.P.
 The Whole 7 Inches (2021)
 Fleshlight (2010)
 I See (2001)

Awards

2021 Dallas Observer North Texas’ 10 Best Live Acts
2021 Fort Worth Weekly Shows of the Year
2011 Denton Record Chronicle's Best of Denton
North Texas Music Hall of Fame - Class of 2011 Inductees

References

External links
 The Wee-Beasties @ Website
 The Wee-Beasties @ Facebook
 The Wee-Beasties @ Instagram
 The Wee-Beasties @ Spotify
 The Wee-Beasties @ Bandcamp

Punk rock groups from Texas
Skate punk groups
Musical groups established in 2000